The Killer may refer to:

Arts, entertainment, and media

Fictional characters
 Ghostface (Scream), aka "The Killer" - the murderer in the Scream movie series

Films
 The Killer (1921 film), an American western film directed by and starring Jack Conway
 The Killer (1953 film), a Turkish adventure film
 The Killer (1972 film), a Hong Kong film produced by Shaw Brothers Studio
 The Killer (1989 film), a Hong Kong action and crime film directed by John Woo and starring Chow Yun Fat
 The Killer (2006 film), a Bollywood film starring Emraan Hashmi and Irrfan Khan
 Le Tueur (English: The Killer), a French film directed by Cédric Anger, released in 2007
 The Killer (2007 film), a horror short starring Michael Learned
 The Killer (2017 film), a Brazilian film
 The Killer (2023 film), a film adaptation of a French comic directed by David Fincher

Literature 
 The Killer (1970 novel), a novel by Colin Wilson
 The Killer (comics), a comic written by Matz
 The Killer (play), English title of Tueur sans gages, a play by Eugène Ionesco
 "The Killer" (short story), a short story by Stephen King
 The Killer, a 1933 novel by Walter B. Gibson about the fictional character The Shadow

Music 
 The Killer (Shed album), 2012
 The Killer (Impious album), 2002
 "The Killer", song by Mobile from the album Tales from the City, 2008

Television
 "The Killer" (The Vampire Diaries), an episode of the television series The Vampire Diaries

People 
"The Killer", a nickname of singer/pianist Jerry Lee Lewis
 The King Killer, a professional wrestler from  United States Wrestling Association

See also
Killer (disambiguation)
The Killers (disambiguation)
Killers (disambiguation)